Masuhara is a surname. Notable people with the surname include:

 Mitsuyuki Masuhara (born 1973), Japanese anime film director
 Yoshitake Masuhara (born 1945), Japanese politician 

Japanese-language surnames